Mercuri is a surname. Notable people with the surname include:

Alessandro Mercuri (born 1973), French-Italian author and director
Mark Mercuri (born 1974), retired Australian rules football player
Rebecca Mercuri, computer scientist specializing in computer security and computer forensics

See also
Mercuri method, modification to DRE voting machine used to verify the count of votes
Mercury (disambiguation)